Hadir Mekhimar (born November 22, 1997, in Cairo) is an Egyptian sport shooter. She shared a top prize with Hungary's István Péni in the mixed international rifle team at the 2014 Summer Youth Olympics.

Mekhimar made her first Olympic team for Egypt as a 16-year-old at the 2014 Summer Youth Olympics in Nanjing, China, where she earned a gold medal in shooting. In her first event, the girls' 10 m air rifle, Mekhimar fired a decent score of 399.6 to attain an eighteenth place from a field of twenty, missing out a chance to compete for the final. Two days later, Mekhimar had atoned from her premature air rifle elimination to help Hungarian colleague István Péni strike a 10–2 victory over the Latin American duo of Fernanda Russo (Argentina) and José Santos Valdés (Mexico) in the gold medal match of the mixed rifle team competition.

References

External links

Nanjing 2014 Profile 

1997 births
Living people
Egyptian female sport shooters
Shooters at the 2014 Summer Youth Olympics
Sportspeople from Cairo
Olympic shooters of Egypt
Shooters at the 2016 Summer Olympics
21st-century Egyptian women